Detention is a rural locality in the local government area (LGA) of Circular Head in the North-west and west LGA region of Tasmania. The 2016 census recorded a population of nil for the state suburb of Detention.

History 
Detention was gazetted as a locality in 1973. 

The Detention River, from which the locality takes its name, was so named in 1826 when a party of surveyors was stranded (detained) there by a flood.

Geography
The estuary of the Detention River forms the western boundary, and the waters of Bass Strait the northern.

Road infrastructure 
Route A2 (Bass Highway) runs through from east to west.

References

Towns in Tasmania
Localities of Circular Head Council